Fridericus Rex (German: Fridericus Rex - 1. Teil: Sturm und Drang) is a 1922 German silent historical film directed by Arzén von Cserépy and starring Otto Gebühr, Albert Steinrück and Gertrud de Lalsky.

It portrays the life of the eighteenth century monarch Frederick the Great. Immensely popular, it was followed by three sequels and launched the Prussian film as a major German genre during the Weimar era.

The film's sets were designed by the art directors Hans Dreier and Ernö Metzner. The film was shot at the Johannisthal Studios in Berlin. Location filming took place at the Charlottenburg Palace and other sites around historic Brandenburg.

Cast
 Otto Gebühr as Friedrich
 Albert Steinrück as Friedrich Wilhelm I
 Gertrud de Lalsky as Sophie Dorothee 
 Charlotte Schultz as Wilhelmine
 Erna Morena as Elisabeth Christine von Braunschweig-Bevern
 Lilly Flohr as Frau von Morien
 Eduard von Winterstein as Leopold Fürst von Anhalt-Dessau 
 Bruno Decarli as Minister Grumbkow
 Eugen Burg
 Theodor Burghardt as General Friedrich Wilhelm von Seydlitz
 Joseph Klein
 Adolf Klein
 Friedrich Kayßler as Count Finkenstein 
 Rolf Prasch
 Franz Groß
 Emil Heß as Minister August Friedrich Von Boden
 Marie von Bülow
 Albert Patry as Müller
 Lili Alexandra as Doris Ritter 
 Wilhelm Prager as Kantor Ritter
 Antonie Jaeckel
 Heinrich George as Prince Charles Alexander of Lorraine
 Trude Hesterberg as Madame de Pompadour 
 Werner Krauss as Count Kaunitz 
 Maria Orska as Barberina Campanini 
 Agnes Straub as Maria Theresa
 Robert Sortch-Pla as Voltaire
 Leopold von Ledebur as Louis XV

References

Bibliography
 Linda Schulte-Sasse. Entertaining the Third Reich: Illusions of Wholeness in Nazi Cinema. Duke University Press, 1996.

External links

1922 films
1920s historical adventure films
German historical adventure films
German epic films
Films of the Weimar Republic
Films directed by Arzén von Cserépy
German silent feature films
German black-and-white films
Prussian films
Films set in the 1720s
Films set in the 1730s
Films set in the 1740s
Films set in the 1750s
UFA GmbH films
Films shot at Johannisthal Studios
Films shot in Berlin
Cultural depictions of Frederick the Great
Silent historical adventure films
1920s German films
1920s German-language films